The New York City Landmarks Preservation Commission (LPC), formed in 1965, is the New York City governmental commission that administers the city's Landmarks Preservation Law. Since its founding, it has designated over a thousand landmarks, classified into four categories: individual landmarks, interior landmarks, scenic landmarks, and historic districts.

The New York City borough of Queens contains 82 landmarks designated by the LPC, 4 interior landmarks, and 13 historic districts. The following is a complete list . Some of these are also National Historic Landmark (NHL) sites, and NHL status is noted where known.

Historic districts

Individual landmarks

Interior landmarks

Former landmarks

See also 
 List of New York City Landmarks

Notes

References

Queens
Locally designated landmarks in the United States
Buildings and structures in Queens, New York
Queens, New York-related lists
New York City Landmarks Preservation Commission
Queens